Pambelé is a Colombian biographical television series created and developed by 11-11 Films, based on the book El oro y la oscuridad: la vida gloriosa y trágica de Kid Pambelé written by Alberto Salcedo Ramos. It stars Jarlin Martínez as the titular character, and it started airing on Colombian broadcast channel RCN Televisión on July 10, 2017, and concluded on November 3, 2017. The series follows the life and history of Colombian boxer Antonio Cervantes.

Plot 
Antonio Cervantes, better known as "The Kid Pambelé", was born on December 23, 1945 in San Basilio de Palenque, played on October 28, 1972 the world boxing title in the Welter Junior category against the champion and everyone's favorite, Alonzo Frizzo. At 27, Antonio was clear that it was his last chance to fight for a world title. Clinging to his convictions, he fought with all his might and connected an uppercut, knocking out Frizzo and giving Pambelé the title.

Antonio Cervantes, played by Jarlin Martínez is a black man, tall, thin, but with muscles marked by his constant training. As a child he had an immense burden on his shoulders and in his youth he was dazzled by his dreams of greatness. Being the eldest of his brothers, Antonio decided to take care of his family with the money that he obtained by selling cigarettes and shuffling shoes. However, at the expense of his mother's repeated scoldings, it was easier for him to get money in the street fights of the Malecón, where Clemente Roballo, the best of Colombia at the time, knows and discovers "The Kid Pambelé".

Cast 
 Jarlin Javier Martínez as Antonio Cervantes
 María Nela Sinisterra as Carolina Orozco Reyes
 Laura Vieira as Aurora Valencia
 Juan Alfonso Baptista as Ezequiel Mercado
 Iván López as Cristóbal Román
 Indhira Serrano as Ceferina Reyes
 Pedro Palacios as Pedro Falcon
 Vince Balanta as Chico Gonzales
 Mauricio Castillo - Milenio
 Mauricio Mejía -  Cachao
 Omar Murillo - Clemente Roballo
 Juan Carlos Arango - Legata
 Jorge Monterrosa - Pete
 Karina Guerra - Noreya 
 Luis Tamayo - Don Pancra 
 Jaisson Jeack - Frizzo
 Iris Oyola - Yamile
 Roberto Fernandez Rizo - Diego Monagas
 Daniella Donado - Freda
 Javier De Zuani - Nicolas Roche
 Franártur Duque - Rafito Veleño
 Angely Gaviria - Julia Cervantes

Reception 
The series premiered as the least seen in Colombia in the evening with a total of 4.5 million viewers. The series did not manage to overcome its opponent El Chema, until it has been one the failures of RCN Televisión like the series El Comandante.

References 

2017 Colombian television series debuts
RCN Televisión original programming
Spanish-language television shows
Colombian drama television series
2017 Colombian television series endings
Television shows set in Colombia